Archie Galbraith Cameron (22 March 18959 August 1956) was an Australian politician. He was a government minister under Joseph Lyons and Robert Menzies, leader of the Country Party from 1939 to 1940, and finally Speaker of the House of Representatives from 1950 until his death.

Cameron was born in Happy Valley, South Australia. After serving in World War I, he took up a farm near Loxton as a soldier settler. He was elected to the South Australian House of Assembly in 1927, and to the House of Representatives at the 1934 federal election. Cameron was Postmaster-General in the Lyons Government from 1938 to 1939. He replaced Earle Page as leader of the Country Party in September 1939, and in March 1940 led the party back into coalition with the United Australia Party (UAP), which Page had broken off. Cameron was de facto deputy prime minister under Menzies, as well as Minister for Commerce and Minister for the Navy. However, he was deposed as Country Party leader in October 1940, subsequently defecting to the UAP (and later joining the new Liberal Party). Cameron's last appointment was as Speaker, where he was highly respected. He was known throughout his political career for his eccentric manner and strong personality.

Early life
Cameron was born in Happy Valley, South Australia, the son of Mary Ann (née McDonald) and John Cameron.  His parents were both immigrants from Scotland. He was educated at state schools and worked on his father's farm at Happy Valley until 1916, when he joined the First Australian Imperial Force and fought on the Western Front.  He was gassed while in the front, suffering severe damage to his heart and lungs.  After World War I Cameron took up farming near Loxton as part of a soldier settlement scheme, and became active in the newly formed Country Party.

State politics
In 1927, Cameron was elected to the seat of Wooroora in the South Australian House of Assembly, and became leader of the state branch of the Country Party.  He helped shepherd the merger of the SA Country Party with the Liberal Federation to form the Liberal and Country League.  As part of the deal, in 1934 he was elected to the House of Representatives for Barker, a mostly conservative seat stretching from rural southeastern South Australia to the outer suburbs of Adelaide.

Federal politics
Cameron did not have long to wait for ministerial preferment; in 1937 he was appointed an assistant minister in the government of Joseph Lyons. In November 1937, Cameron stood for the deputy leadership of the Country Party following the retirement of Thomas Paterson; he did not win enough votes to make the second ballot.  He briefly served as acting minister for commerce in 1938, and during that time became the first minister to be "named" by the Speaker.  Later that year, he became Postmaster-General.  He temporarily suspended radio 2KY's licence because he objected to political views expressed on it (2KY was the property of the ALP's New South Wales branch).

Leader of the Country Party

Cameron was elected leader of the Country Party on 13 September 1939, following the resignation of Earle Page. He defeated John McEwen by seven votes to five, with two abstentions. According to McEwen, the result was skewed by the absence of four MPs who had refused to sit with the Country Party with Page as leader – a motion to re-admit them was defeated by seven votes to six. McEwen claimed in his memoirs that the dissident MPs were "all strong supporters of mine and, had they been allowed to vote, I would have won the election". They were all re-admitted to the party a few months later.

In March 1940, Cameron took the Country Party back into the coalition government under Menzies, becoming the de facto deputy prime minister as well as Minister for Commerce and Minister for the Navy. After the 1940 election, however, the Country Party tired of Cameron's domineering style, and replaced him as leader with Arthur Fadden. Cameron then immediately resigned from the ministry, and from the Country Party: he joined Menzies's party, the United Australia Party. He rejoined the Army and spent the rest of the war on active service in the Directorate of Military Intelligence at Army Headquarters, Melbourne, where he did useful work on the Japanese order of battle.  While he was in the service, he faced what would be his only really close electoral contest.  At the 1943 election, trade unionist Harry Krantz slashed Cameron's majority from a comfortably safe 15.9 percent to an extremely marginal 1.7 percent.  Cameron was left as the only non-Labor MP from South Australia, and the only  non-Labor member outside the eastern states (the member for Northern Territory Adair Blain was an independent, but did not have full voting rights).

Speaker of the House of Representatives
Cameron followed most of the UAP into Menzies's new party, the Liberal Party, and when the Liberals won the 1949 elections Menzies appointed him Speaker of the House: mainly, it was said, to keep him out of the Cabinet. He presided over the House with an autocratic style that caused a number of celebrated rows with members on both sides.  Cameron's health never recovered from his World War I gassing, and in August 1955 he contracted influenza.  Despite this, he fought that year's election and was handily reelected.  He would die of a heart attack in August in Royal Prince Alfred Hospital, Sydney.

Personal life
Cameron married Margaret Eileen Walsh on 15 April 1925. They had a son and a daughter together; his daughter predeceased him.

Cameron was raised Presbyterian, but later converted to Catholicism, which was his wife's religion. He was known for choosing to affirm (rather than swear) the oath of office, citing Jesus's admonition to "swear not at all".

References

1895 births
1956 deaths
Australian monarchists
Members of the South Australian House of Assembly
Liberal Party of Australia members of the Parliament of Australia
National Party of Australia members of the Parliament of Australia
United Australia Party members of the Parliament of Australia
Members of the Cabinet of Australia
Members of the Australian House of Representatives for Barker
Members of the Australian House of Representatives
Speakers of the Australian House of Representatives
Liberal and Country League politicians
Australian people of Scottish descent
Leaders of the National Party of Australia
20th-century Australian politicians
Australian Roman Catholics
Converts from Presbyterianism
Converts to Roman Catholicism from Calvinism